The Kingsway tramway subway is a cut-and-cover Grade II Listed tunnel in central London, built by the London County Council, and the only one of its kind in Britain. The decision in 1898 to clear slum districts in the Holborn area provided an opportunity to use the new streets for a tramway connecting the lines in the north and south. Following the pattern of tramways in New York (the Murray Hill Tunnel) and Boston (the MBTA Green Line), it was decided to build this as an underground connection.

History

1902–1905: Construction
The London County Council had for many years wanted to connect its "North Side" and "South Side" tramway networks in order to be able to send "North Side" trams for overhaul to the Central Repair Depot at Charlton in South East London. In 1902, it decided to build a subway from Theobalds Road in the north to the Embankment underneath Waterloo Bridge to the south, from where a surface line would continue over the bridge. Legal problems delayed permission to build the subway and tram route and it was not until 1906 that permission to build was granted, and then not to cross the bridge. Because of a sewer at the northern end and the District Railway to the south it was decided to build the subway for single-deck trams only. After leaving the subway at the south end, trams turned right along the Embankment to Westminster Bridge or left on a service from Bloomsbury to the Hop Exchange. This latter service was short-lived and the tracks were removed in 1930.

The approach from the north near Southampton Row was a  open cutting with a 1 in 10 (10%) gradient. The tracks passed through cast iron tubes underneath the Fleet sewer before rising slightly to enter Holborn tramway station. South from here the subway was built with a steel roof to Aldwych tramway station and, because it was not initially planned to run a public service south of here, the tracks leading towards the Strand were used as a depot with appropriate equipment and inspection pits.

In the parliamentary session of 1905, plans were submitted for an additional station at the south end of the tunnel, under Wellington Street. The opening of the new tramway along the Embankment meant it was decided to link up with this route instead and the station was never built. A new sharp curve was built under Lancaster Place to enable an exit through the western side wall of Waterloo Bridge and a triangular junction with the through line was constructed. The eastern side of this junction, leading to Blackfriars, was removed as part of the 1930s upgrade.

1906: Opening
Services opened to the public on 24 February 1906 from Angel to Aldwych, with a ceremonial opening by the chairman of the Highways Committee. The first journey took 12 minutes northbound and 10 minutes to return, despite horse-drawn vehicles also using the roads on the surface part of the route. On 16 November that year the routes were extended north from The Angel to Highbury station. Special trams were constructed from non-flammable materials – wooden trams, common on other routes, were not permitted through the subway.

Through services commenced on 10 April 1908 from Highbury station to Tower Bridge and to Kennington Gate, with a procession of six cars going south from Holborn through to Kennington, then to Elephant & Castle in order to return through the subway to Angel. The Kennington service was not commercially viable and services were diverted to operate to Queens Road in Battersea which, due to a low bridge, could be operated with single-deck vehicles only. Drivers of the trams recorded difficulty in climbing the ramp north from Holborn tramway station and would sometimes roll all the way back to the station. Drivers on routes through the subway had to have at least two years' experience on other services to be considered for these routes.

1929: Double-decker trams
Service patterns continued to change, especially with the opening of tram lines over Blackfriars Bridge on 14 September 1909, and during the 1920s it was realised that to remain profitable the subway needed to be able to take double-deck trams. Work started on 11 September of that year, resulting in the replacement of the cast iron tubes by a new steel girder-supported roof and the diversion of the sewer. After the last services ran on the night of 2 February 1930 the subway was closed until the formal re-opening on 14 January 1931 using E/3 type tram no. 1931 on new route 31, with public services starting the following day. The two tramway stations were also completely rebuilt. Routes were now Hackney to Wandsworth or Tooting, Leyton  to Westminster, Highbury to Waterloo station or Norbury and Archway to Kennington.

A weekend service between Highgate (Archway) and Downham via Brockley ran until 1932.

1935–1940: Introduction of trolleybuses
The London Passenger Transport Board was formed in 1933, taking over the London County Council trams. It was decided soon after to replace all trams in London by "more modern vehicles". The abandonment programme began in 1935 with trams in South-West, West, North-West, North and East London mostly being replaced by trolleybuses. The replacement programme proceeded swiftly until 1940, when the last of the pre-war series of conversions occurred, leaving only the South London trams and the subway routes 31, 33 and 35, the only North London tram routes to survive the war.

Prototype Kingsway trolleybus no. 1379, with exits on both sides with folding doors, was constructed for feasibility tests through the subway, but these were unsuccessful as trolleybuses would have had to run on battery power through the subway, headroom restrictions making it impossible to use overhead current collection. The vehicle was retained and ran in normal service alongside conventional trolleybuses.

Waterloo Bridge rebuilding

In 1937, the rebuilding of Waterloo Bridge required the diversion of the side entrance to the tramway to a new position centrally underneath the bridge, which opened on 21 November of that year. There were metal doors covering this entrance until 2007, when construction began on the London Buddha Bar, which opened in autumn 2008.

1946–1952: Withdrawal of trams
In 1946, it was decided to replace London's remaining trams "as soon as possible", this time by diesel buses. The first subway route to be withdrawn was route 31, on 1 October 1950, with the remaining two routes, 33 and 35, being withdrawn after service on Saturday, 5 April 1952, the last public services being 'specials' on the Sunday, shortly after midnight. During the early hours of the next morning the remaining trams north of the subway were run through to the depots south of the Thames.

1952–1957: Closure
Trams were abandoned in London on 5 July 1952, after which street tracks were lifted, but those in the subway mostly remain in place. In 1953, London Transport used the tramway to store 120 unused buses and coaches in case they were needed for the Coronation but proposals to convert the tramway subway to a car park or a film studio failed and it was leased out as a storage facility from October 1957.

After closure, a number of cartoons appeared in London newspapers based on the closed tramway, with ghostly trams or 'lost' tube trains. On 23 November 1954 an edition of The Goon Show entitled 'The Last Tram' featured a driver and conductress (Henry Crun and Minnie Bannister) who hid in the subway for 2½ years in order to ensure they were London's last tram.

1958 to present: Strand Underpass and other uses

In June 1958, the London County Council proposed making use of the subway for light traffic from Waterloo Bridge in order to reduce traffic congestion at its junction with Strand and, in April 1962, the go-ahead was given for part of the southern end of the subway to be used. Construction began that September and it opened as the Strand Underpass on 21 January 1964.

The southern section of the abandoned subway between the Embankment and the Strand Underpass was converted into a branch of the Buddha Bar chain of bar/restaurants.  This involved the demolition of the pedestrian subways under Waterloo Bridge and extensive construction in the bridge's undercroft. The site is now Proud Carabet.

Until the opening of the Thames Barrier in 1984, a portable building near the north of the tunnel was used as a flood control headquarters for the Greater London Council.

Between 8 October and 8 November 2009, the tunnel hosted a site-specific art installation called Chord by the artist Conrad Shawcross.

Although following the same route along Kingsway, it was not envisaged that the proposed Cross River Tram would use the subway. The Cross River Tram project was cancelled in 2008.

In 2012, it was announced that Crossrail's tunnel contractor BAM Nuttall/Ferrovial/Kier (BFK) would form a grout shaft beneath the original tunnel of the old central London subway. The purpose of the grout shafts was to stabilize the ground in anticipation of the arrival of tunnel boring equipment in 2013.

Crossrail agreed to restore the tunnel to its former condition on completion of the tunnel boring project, and a planning application to undertake this restoration was submitted in 2017.

The Greater London Authority publication Human Streets in March 2016 contained the proposal that the tunnel could be opened for cycling, in order to connect cyclists using the busy Theobalds Road route with the East-West Cycle Superhighway on the Embankment, thereby avoiding four junctions difficult for cyclists.

In July 2021 it was announced that visitors would be able to tour the tunnel, platforms and halls of the Kingsway station, in a programme organised by the London Transport Museum.

The remaining Grade II listed structure is currently used as storage for masonry (due to low fire risk) by London Borough of Camden and a fire suppression unit for the adjoining service tunnels which experienced a fire in 2015.

In popular culture
The remaining northern part of the subway is sometimes used in films, for example as itself in the Stephen Poliakoff film Hidden City, the secret entrance to the base in the film version of The Avengers and a railway tunnel in the film Bhowani Junction. It also appeared in The Escapist.
In an episode of The Goon Show, Neddie Seagoon discovers that a long-lost tram has been hijacked by its driver Henry Crun and is hidden in the Kingsway tunnel.

See also
 Conduit current collection
 Kingsway, London

References

External links

London Transport Museum Photographic Archive

Subterranea Britannica page on Kingsway Tram Subway
History, old photos, and illustrated account of a visit to the site in November 2003
Chord @ Kingsway Tunnel, flickr photoset about an art installation in the tunnel, showing views of the tunnel itself — October 2009

1906 establishments in England
1910s in the City of Westminster
20th century in the City of Westminster
Grade II listed buildings in the London Borough of Camden
Grade II listed tunnels
History of the London Borough of Camden
Standard gauge railways in London
Trams in London
Transport architecture in London
Tunnels completed in 1906
Tunnels in London